This list shows the IUCN Red List status of the 77 mammal species occurring in the Netherlands. Two are endangered, two are vulnerable, and seven are near threatened.
The following tags are used to highlight each species' status as assessed on the respective IUCN Red List published by the International Union for Conservation of Nature:

Order: Rodentia (rodents) 

Rodents make up the largest order of mammals, with over 40% of mammalian species. They have two incisors in the upper and lower jaw which grow continually and must be kept short by gnawing.
Suborder: Sciurognathi
Family: Castoridae (beavers)
Genus: Castor
 Eurasian beaver, C. fiber 
Family: Sciuridae (squirrels)
Subfamily: Sciurinae
Genus: Sciurus
 Red squirrel, S. vulgaris 
Family: Gliridae (dormice)
Subfamily: Leithiinae
Genus: Eliomys
Garden dormouse, E. quercinus 
Genus: Muscardinus
 Hazel dormouse, Muscardinus avellanarius LC
Family: Cricetidae
Subfamily: Cricetinae
Genus: Cricetus
European hamster, C. cricetus 
Subfamily: Arvicolinae
Genus: Arvicola
 European water vole, A. amphibius 
 Montane water vole, A. scherman LC
Genus: Clethrionomys
 Bank vole, Myodes glareolus LC
Genus: Microtus
 Field vole, Microtus agrestis LC
 Common vole, Microtus arvalis LC
 Tundra vole, Microtus oeconomus arenicola LC
 European pine vole, Microtus subterraneus LC
Family: Muridae (mice, rats, voles, gerbils, hamsters)
Subfamily: Murinae
Genus: Apodemus
 Yellow-necked mouse, Apodemus flavicollis LC
 Wood mouse, Apodemus sylvaticus LC
Genus: Micromys
 Eurasian harvest mouse, Micromys minutus LC
Genus: Mus
House mouse, M. musculus 
Genus: Rattus
 Brown rat, R. norvegicus LC
Black rat, R. rattus

Order: Lagomorpha (lagomorphs) 

The lagomorphs comprise two families, Leporidae (hares and rabbits), and Ochotonidae (pikas). Though they can resemble rodents, and were classified as a superfamily in that order until the early twentieth century, they have since been considered a separate order. They differ from rodents in a number of physical characteristics, such as having four incisors in the upper jaw rather than two.

Genus: Lepus
 European hare, L. europaeus 
Family: Leporidae (rabbits, hares)
Genus: Oryctolagus
European rabbit, O. cuniculus  introduced

Order: Eulipotyphla (shrews, hedgehogs and moles) 

Eulipotyphlans are insectivorous mammals. Shrews and solenodons resemble mice, hedgehogs carry spines, gymnures look more like large rats, while moles are stout-bodied burrowers. 
Family: Erinaceidae (hedgehogs)
Subfamily: Erinaceinae
Genus: Erinaceus
West European hedgehog, E. europaeus 
Family: Soricidae (shrews)
Subfamily: Crocidurinae
Genus: Crocidura
 Bicolored shrew, C. leucodon LC
 Greater white-toothed shrew, C. russula LC
Subfamily: Soricinae
Tribe: Nectogalini
Genus: Neomys
 Eurasian water shrew, Neomys fodiens LC
Tribe: Soricini
Genus: Sorex
 Common shrew, Sorex araneus LC
 Crowned shrew, Sorex coronatus LC
 Eurasian pygmy shrew, Sorex minutus LC
Family: Talpidae (moles)
Subfamily: Talpinae
Tribe: Talpini
Genus: Talpa
 European mole, Talpa europaea LC

Order: Chiroptera (bats) 

The bats' most distinguishing feature is that their forelimbs are developed as wings, making them the only mammals capable of flight. Bat species account for about 20% of all mammals.
Family: Vespertilionidae
Subfamily: Myotinae
Genus: Myotis
Bechstein's bat, M. bechsteini 
Brandt's bat, M. brandti 
Pond bat, M. dasycneme 
Daubenton's bat, M. daubentonii  
Geoffroy's bat, M. emarginatus 
Greater mouse-eared bat, M. myotis 
Whiskered bat, M. mystacinus 
Natterer's bat, M. nattereri 
Subfamily: Vespertilioninae
Genus: Barbastella
Western barbastelle, B. barbastellus 
Genus: Eptesicus
 Northern bat, E. nilssonii LC
 Serotine bat, E. serotinus LC
Genus: Nyctalus
Common noctule, N. noctula 
Lesser noctule, N. leisleri 
Genus: Pipistrellus
Nathusius' pipistrelle, P. nathusii 
 Common pipistrelle, P. pipistrellus LC
 Soprano pipistrelle, P. pygmaeus LC
Genus: Plecotus
Brown long-eared bat, P. auritus 
 Grey long-eared bat, P. austriacus LC
Genus: Vespertilio
 Parti-coloured bat, V. murinus LC

Order: Cetacea (whales) 

The order Cetacea includes whales, dolphins and porpoises. They are the mammals most fully adapted to aquatic life with a spindle-shaped nearly hairless body, protected by a thick layer of blubber, and forelimbs and tail modified to provide propulsion underwater.
Suborder: Mysticeti
Family: Balaenidae
Genus: Balaena
 Bowhead whale, Balaena mysticetus LC (vagrant)
Genus: Eubalaena
 North Atlantic right whale, Eubalaena glacialis EN (functionally extinct in north eastern Atlantic, a possible right whale was sighted off Texel and Schouwen-Duiveland in 2005.)
Family: Balaenopteridae
Subfamily: Balaenopterinae
Genus: Balaenoptera
 Minke whale, Balaenoptera acutorostrata LC
 Sei whale, Balaenoptera borealis EN
 Fin whale, Balaenoptera physalus EN
Genus: Megaptera
 Humpback whale, Megaptera novaeangliae LC
Suborder: Odontoceti
Superfamily: Platanistoidea
Family: Monodontidae
Genus: Monodon
 Narwhal, Monodon monoceros NT
Genus: Delphinapterus
 Beluga, Delphinapterus leucas LC vagrant
Family: Phocoenidae
Genus: Phocoena
 Harbour porpoise, Phocoena phocoena LC
Family: Physeteridae
Genus: Physeter
 Sperm whale, Physeter macrocephalus VU
Family: Kogiidae
Genus: Kogia
Pygmy sperm whale, K. breviceps 
Family: Ziphidae
Subfamily: Hyperoodontinae
Genus: Hyperoodon
 Northern bottlenose whale, Hyperoodon ampullatus DD
Genus: Mesoplodon
 Sowerby's beaked whale, Mesoplodon bidens DD
 Blainville's beaked whale, Mesoplodon densirostris DD
 Gray's beaked whale, Mesoplodon grayi DD
Subfamily: Ziphiinae
Genus: Ziphius
 Cuvier's beaked whale, Ziphius cavirostris LC
Family: Delphinidae (marine dolphins)
 Genus: Lagenorhynchus
 White-beaked dolphin, Lagenorhynchus albirostris LC
 Genus: Leucopleurus
 Atlantic white-sided dolphin, Leucopleurus acutus LC
Genus: Tursiops
 Bottlenose dolphin, Tursiops truncatus LC
Genus: Stenella
 Striped dolphin, Stenella coeruleoalba LC
Genus: Delphinus
 Short-beaked common dolphin, Delphinus delphis LC
Genus: Grampus
 Risso's dolphin, Grampus griseus LC
Genus: Globicephala
 Long-finned pilot whale, Globicephala melas DD
Genus: Orcinus
Orca, O. orca

Order: Carnivora (carnivorans) 

There are over 260 species of carnivorans, the majority of which feed primarily on meat. They have a characteristic skull shape and dentition. 
Suborder: Feliformia
Family: Felidae (cats)
Subfamily: Felinae
Genus: Felis
European wildcat, F. silvestris 
Family: Viverridae
Subfamily: Viverrinae
Genus: Genetta
 Common genet, G. genetta  introduced, presence uncertain
Suborder: Caniformia
Family: Canidae (dogs, foxes)
Genus: Canis
 Gray wolf, C. lupus 
Genus: Vulpes
 Red fox, V. vulpes 
Family: Mustelidae (mustelids)
Genus: Lutra
 European otter, L. lutra 
Genus: Martes
 Beech marten, M. foina 
European pine marten, M. martes 
Genus: Meles
European badger, M. meles 
Genus: Mustela
Stoat, M. erminea 
European mink, M. lutreola 
Least weasel, M. nivalis 
European polecat, M. putorius 
Genus: Neogale
American mink, N. vison  presence uncertain, introduced
Family: Phocidae (earless seals)
Genus: Cystophora
 Hooded seal, Cystophora cristata VU
Genus: Halichoerus
 Grey seal, Halichoerus grypus LC
Genus: Pagophilus
 Harp seal, Pagophilus groenlandicus LC
Genus: Phoca
 Common seal, Phoca vitulina LC
Genus: Pusa
 Ringed seal, Pusa hispida LC

Order: Artiodactyla (even-toed ungulates) 

The even-toed ungulates are ungulates whose weight is borne about equally by the third and fourth toes, rather than mostly or entirely by the third as in perissodactyls. There are about 220 artiodactyl species, including many that are of great economic importance to humans.
Family: Cervidae (deer)
Subfamily: Cervinae
Genus: Cervus
 Red deer, C. elaphus 
Genus: Dama
 European fallow deer, D. dama  introduced
Subfamily: Capreolinae
Genus: Capreolus
 Roe deer, C. capreolus 
Family: Suidae (pigs)
Subfamily: Suinae
Genus: Sus
Wild boar, S. scrofa

Locally extinct 
The following species are locally extinct in the country:
European bison, Bison bonasus
European wildcat, Felis silvestris
Greater horseshoe bat, Rhinolophus ferrumequinum
Lesser horseshoe bat, Rhinolophus hipposideros
Brown bear, Ursus arctos
Moose, Alces alces

See also
List of chordate orders
Lists of mammals by region
List of prehistoric mammals
Mammal classification
List of mammals described in the 2000s

References

External links

Mammals
Mammals
Netherlands
Netherlands